Rameshwar Nath "Ramesh" Mehta, (born 7 August 1923) is an Indian playwright, director, actor and translator.

Biography
Mehta moved to Delhi in 1942 in search of a job after his graduation. His farce Under Secretary has been translated into many Indian languages, including Tamil, Malayalam, Sindhi, Bengali, and Gujarati. Mehta was awarded the Sangeet Natak Akademi Award for acting in 2007.

References

1923 births
Living people
Dramatists and playwrights from Jammu and Kashmir
Film directors from Jammu and Kashmir
20th-century Indian translators
Indian male dramatists and playwrights
Recipients of the Sangeet Natak Akademi Award
20th-century Indian dramatists and playwrights
20th-century Indian male writers